Cyril Graff (born 1980) is a French sport shooter. He was born in Nancy. He competed at the 2012 Summer Olympics in London, where he placed fourth in 50 metre rifle three positions.  He also came 46th in the 50 metre rifle prone event.

References

1980 births
Living people
Sportspeople from Nancy, France
French male sport shooters
Olympic shooters of France
Shooters at the 2012 Summer Olympics
Shooters at the 2016 Summer Olympics
European Games competitors for France
Shooters at the 2015 European Games
20th-century French people
21st-century French people